Apocalypse Nerd is a six-issue comic book limited series created by Peter Bagge and published by Dark Horse Comics.

Publication history

The six issue miniseries ran between 2005 and 2007. The collected graphic novel version was released in 2008.

Plot
The story revolves around two men, Perry and Gordo, attempting to survive in the wilds of the Pacific Northwest after Seattle is destroyed in a North Korean nuclear attack. Perry is a somewhat introverted computer programmer whilst his longtime friend Gordo works in various "self-employed" fields and is also a drug dealer. The story is a masculine character study as the two evolve and adapt to the changes in the post-apocalyptic world. Gordo becomes more amoralistic while Perry learns survival skills. Both have unique personality traits which help them adapt.

The end of every main chapter is followed by a story of the American Founding Fathers. These are somewhat humorous and based on actual events.

Collected editions
A trade paperback collection released in March 2008.

Television adaptation
Fantagraphics, who publish much of Bagge's work, reported in early 2010 that Apocalypse Nerd was adapted as a six-part series for television by Nois Productions (Alex Carvalho/Tupaq Felber) and the pilot was being pitched to BBC. It was renamed first as Fallout (Nois released a 25-minute short film version under that title on February 1, 2013) and then Wasted. The full film has yet to be released.

Notes

References

External links
 Dark Horse Press Release
 Author discusses making Apocalypse Nerd